The Golconda Formation is a geologic formation in Kentucky. It preserves fossils dating back to the Carboniferous period. In Indiana, the Golconda, it is called the Golconda Limestone and is part of the Stephensport Group.

See also

 List of fossiliferous stratigraphic units in Kentucky

References

Carboniferous Kentucky
Carboniferous Illinois
Carboniferous Indiana
Carboniferous southern paleotropical deposits